The Jazz Scene is a 1949 compilation album edited by Norman Granz, featuring recordings from Ralph Burns, Duke Ellington, George Handy, Coleman Hawkins, Neal Hefti, Machito, Charlie Parker, Flip Phillips, Bud Powell, Willie Smith, Billy Strayhorn and Lester Young.

The album was recorded in  Los Angeles and New York City from 1946 to 1949, and released by Mercury Records as a $25 6 LP record limited deluxe box set and released the week before Christmas 1949.

The album was reissued various times in 10-inch and 12-inch format, and later, was remastered and expanded to include numerous previously unreleased pieces as a double CD released by Universal Records in 1994 titled The Complete Jazz Scene by Richard Seidel.

In 2007, The Jazz Scene was added to the National Recording Registry by the Library of Congress.

Background and content 

After organizing his first Jazz at the Philharmonic concert in early July 1944, young impresario Norman Granz began recording well-known musicians of the era for his Clef label. From the material he published the album The Jazz Scene in 1949, which is considered one of the first albums (box sets) in jazz: on 12 discs presented the then current scene of modern jazz ; including well known names such as Coleman Hawkins, Charlie Parker, Lester Young, Duke Ellington and Bud Powell.

The album thus showed stylistic diversity; it contained mainstream jazz by the trio of Lester Young (with pianist Nat Cole, credited as Auy Guy for contractual reasons) and the Willie Smith Quintet, as well as two tracks by a small combo featuring Duke Ellington, accompanied by strings, Neal Hefti's large orchestra with the added Charlie Parker solo part ("Repetition"), Coleman Hawkins' famous tenor solo ("Picasso", 1948), Machito's Latin ensemble, a 1949 Charlie Parker quartet session, the Bud Powell Trio, and big band recordings conducted by Ralph Burns and George Handy.

Granz brought out the current pieces by these musicians, some of which were recorded specifically for this edition, on six 78 discs, accompanied by a set of photographs of the musicians from Gjon Mili, and liner notes for each part of the edition. The box featured a cover illustration by David Stone Martin . In the introduction, in which he clarified that he had given the musicians complete artistic freedom, Granz wrote:

 "This is our attempt to present today's jazz scene in terms of the visual, the written word, and the auditory."
 "This is our attempt to present the current jazz scene visually, in the written word and audibly."

The set was sold in a limited edition, numbered and signed by Granz of just 5,000 copies for $25.

Reception 
Down Beat Magazine wrote about this album at the time:

 " The Jazz Scene, probably the most remarkable record album ever issued.......the slighly delayed love child of JATP promoter Norman Granz ".

In Allmusic , Scott Yanow recognized the 1994 edition (The Complete Jazz Scene) "as one of the most significant releases of the year" and highlighted "the superb box set with photographs by Gjon Mili and the detailed liner notes"; "the edition is essential for all serious jazz collections". With the original edition from 1949, producer Norman Granz released "a remarkable album that perfectly represented the modern jazz scene of the time". In particular, he highlighted Coleman Hawkins' pioneering work of the unaccompanied tenor saxophone solo ("Picasso").

Track listing

References 

1949 compilation albums
United States National Recording Registry recordings
1940s compilation albums